Route 360, also known as Bay d'Espoir Highway, is a provincial highway in Newfoundland and Labrador. It runs from the Bishop's Falls area to Bay d'Espoir and Harbour Breton. The road is very isolated for at least , where there are no communities or stops to refuel. Bishop's Falls and Harbour Breton are the only two settlements of any size along the entire length of Route 360, with other towns and communities being along the other highways it intersects.

Cell phone reception along Route 360 is severely limited. In 2022, Route 360 was voted the second Worst Road in Atlantic Canada by the Canadian Automobile Association's Worst Roads list.

Route description

Route 360 begins as Southside Drive in Harbour Breton at a dead end along the coast of Fortune Bay. It winds its way west through neighbourhoods before bypassing downtown along Canada Drive. The highway now leaves Harbour Breton and winds its way northward up the entire length of the Connaigre Peninsula to have an intersection with Route 364 (Hermitage River Road). Route 360 heads up the Hermitage River Valley to pass by Hardy's Cove and have an intersection with Route 362 (Belleoram Road) before winding its way through remote, scenic, and hilly terrain for the next several kilometres. The highway now passes by Jipujijkuei Kuespem Provincial Park and has intersections with Route 365 (Conne River Road) and Route 361 (St. Alban's Road), where it crosses the Conne River before heading through remote wilderness for the next , where the highway crosses the Northwest Gander River. Route 360 now enters the outskirts of Bishop's Falls, where the comes to an end at an intersection with Route 1 (Trans-Canada Highway).

Major intersections

See also
Bay d'Espoir
Connaigre Peninsula
Miawpukek First Nation
List of Newfoundland and Labrador highways

References

360